Svolvær Airport is a regional airport serving the town of Svolvær in Vågan Municipality (and the Lofoten region surrounding Svolvær) in Nordland county, Norway.

Service
The airport is operated by Avinor. It is served by Widerøe with Dash 8 aircraft connecting the community to Bodø and other communities in Nordland.  The services are all on subsidized public service obligation routes administered by the Norwegian Ministry of Transportation and Communication. The airport also has direct flights to Oslo.

In 2014, Svolvær Airport had 74,496 passengers. In 2007, a new road (Lofoten Mainland Connection) opened which allows driving to the Harstad/Narvik Airport, but Svolvær Airport has kept its passenger figures.

Airlines and destinations

Ground transportation 
There is no bus service to the airport, but taxis are available.

Statistics

Future

Avinor is planning building a new primary airport to serve Lofoten and possibly also Vesterålen. The region wants to be more attractive on the conference market which would create more job opportunities outside the tourist season, and there is a need to adopt airports to modern aircraft types.

Two locations have been put forward, Gimsøya and Hadselsanden.  The former could replace Leknes Airport and Svolvær Airport, Helle, the latter could also replace Stokmarknes Airport. As both alternatives imply direct services to Oslo, the leakage to Evenes Airport would be reduced. Gimsøy was the most favoured alternative since Stokmarknes needs ferry access if its airport is replaced, or a future tunnel which seems to expensive, and because Hadselsanden is fairly distant from Leknes. However weather recordings has shown that Gimsøy, located at the big ocean, is too windy and foggy for an airport. Therefore, the main option now is to extend Leknes, considering that Svolvær airport has no room for extension.

References

Airports in Nordland
Airports in the Arctic
Avinor airports
Vågan
1972 establishments in Norway
Airports established in 1972